Gideon's Torch is a 1995 novel in which a newly-elected President of the United States must deal with a crisis that challenges his administration's agenda and changes the course of the nation. 

A political thriller by Charles Colson and Ellen Vaughn,  its main themes include abortion, anti-abortion violence, and the inside of both movements. It also portrays an alternate 1994 election in which a pro-choice Republican is elected. 

1995 American novels
American political novels
American thriller novels
Novels about abortion